Arturo Muñoz Gutiérrez (born 31 December 1984) is a Mexican former footballer. He last played as a left-back for Atlante of the Primera División de Mexico.

Honours
Atlante
Mexican Primera División: Apertura 2007

References

External links

1984 births
Living people
Atlante F.C. footballers
Footballers from Mexico City
Liga MX players
Mexican footballers
Association football wingers
Association football fullbacks